In molecular biology, disrupted in schizophrenia 2 (non-protein coding), also known as DISC2, is a long non-coding RNA molecule. In humans, the DISC2 gene that produces the DISC2 RNA molecule is located on chromosome 1, at the breakpoint associated with the chromosomal translocation found in Schizophrenia. It is antisense to the DISC1 gene and may regulate the expression of DISC1. DISC2 may also contribute to other psychiatric disorders.

See also 
 Long noncoding RNA

References

Further reading 

 
 
 
 
 
 
 
 

Non-coding RNA